Maria Tescanu Rosetti (1879–1968), was a Romanian aristocrat and royal court official.

Life 
Born in Berești-Tazlău, Bacău County, she was a descendant of some illustrious Moldavian boyar families. Her father Dumitru was descended from the Rosetti family, and from her mother, Alice Rosetti-Tescanus, from the Negri-Jora, and both were well-known intellectuals. Dumitru was a philosopher, sociologist, publicist, translator of Vasile Conta's work into French, and her mother, known to have collected "one of the most valuable libraries of the time" was a pianist connoisseur of universal music and literature.

She spent her childhood and adolescence in Tescani and was schooled at home by governesses, who helped Maria acquire "a vast culture through reading, correspondence and travel."

She was a lady-in-waiting to queen Marie of Romania. At the age of 19, she married Mihail G. Cantacuzino, her first husband and they became parents to the aviator Constantin Cantacuzino. Later she was a lover of Nae Ionescu and later married to composer George Enescu. 

She moved in Romania's highest aristocratic circles and befriended by Matila Ghyka, Jean Chryssoveloni, Martha Bibescu, Cella Delavrancea, Nae Ionescu and Alice Voinescu.

During World War I, she was a central figure in a scandal at an Iași hospital, where she was among those who had forced wounded soldiers to perform for her and her guests during banquets. 

In February 1918, she was one of a group of female aristocrats who, supported by the queen, participated in a demonstration against the war policy of Prime Minister General Alexandru Averescu.

She died in Geneva at age 90 in 1968, and was buried at Père Lachaise Cemetery in Paris, next to the remains of her second husband George Enescu.

Work 
Maria published her memoirs, written in French (Ombres et lumière. Souvenirs d´une Princesse Moldave/ Shadows and lights. Memories of a Moldavian princess), where she described the evolution of Romanian society from 1850 to 1953.

References 

1879 births
1968 deaths
People from Bacău County
Ladies-in-waiting
20th-century Romanian women
Burials at Père Lachaise Cemetery